An Individualized Education Program (IEP) is a legal document under United States law that is developed for each public school child in the U.S. who needs special education. It is created through a team of the child's parent(s) and district personnel who are knowledgeable about the child's needs. IEPs must be reviewed every year to keep track of the child's educational progress.

An IEP outlines the special education experience for all eligible students with a disability. An eligible student is any child in the U.S between the ages of 3-21 attending a public school and has been evaluated as having a need in the form of a specific learning disability, autism, emotional disturbance, other health impairments, intellectual disability, orthopedic impairment, multiple disabilities, hearing impairments, deafness, visual impairment, deaf-blindness, developmental delay, speech/language impairment, or traumatic brain injury. The IEP describes present levels of performance, strengths, and needs, and creates measurable goals based on this data. It provides accommodations, modifications, related services, and specialized academic instruction to ensure that every eligible child receives a "Free Appropriate Public Education" (FAPE) in the "Least Restrictive Environment" (LRE). The IEP is intended to help children reach educational goals more easily than they otherwise would. The four component goals are: conditions, learner, behavior, and criteria. In all cases, the IEP must be tailored to the individual student's needs as identified by the IEP evaluation process, and must help teachers and related service providers (such as paraprofessional educators) understand the student's disability and how the disability affects the learning process.

The IEP describes how the student learns, how the student best demonstrates that learning, and what teachers and service providers will do to help the student learn more effectively. Developing an IEP requires the team to evaluate the student in all areas of suspected disability, consider the student's ability to access the general education curriculum, consider how the disability affects the student's learning, and choose a federal placement for the student.

As long as a student qualifies for special education, the IEP is mandated to be regularly maintained and updated up to the point of high school graduation or prior to the 21st or 22nd birthday. If a student in special education attends university upon graduation, they are no longer "children with disabilities" under the Individuals with Disabilities Education Improvement Act of 2004 and are instead protected under Section 504. They can apply for and receive Section 504 accommodations, but the process is very different. Placements in public schools often occur in "general education" classrooms. Other types of placements include RSP (within a resource room), Special Day Class, Self Contained Class, Co-Teacher and specialized classes, or sub-specialties taught by a special education teacher. Students can also be removed from an IEP if it is determined the student is no longer eligible upon reevaluation.

An IEP is meant to ensure that students receive an appropriate placement not only in special education classrooms or special schools. It is designed to give the student a chance to participate in regular school culture and academics as much as is possible for that individual student. In this way, the student is able to have specialized assistance only when such assistance is absolutely necessary, and otherwise maintains the freedom to interact with and participate in activities to the same extent of their non-disabled/general education peers.

IEP required components 
In the US, the Individuals with Disabilities Education Act (IDEA) requires public schools to develop an IEP for every student with a disability who is found to meet the federal and state requirements for special education. The IEP must be designed to provide the child with a Free Appropriate Public Education (FAPE). The term IEP refers to both the educational program provided to a child with a disability and to the written document that describes that educational program. The IDEA requires that an IEP be written according to the needs of each student who is eligible under the IDEA; an IEP must also meet state regulations. The following must be included:
The student's present levels of academic and functional performance
Measurable annual goals, including academic and functional goals
How the student's progress toward meeting annual goals is to be measured and reported to the parents
Special-education and related services, as well as supplementary aids to be provided to the student
Schedule of services to be provided, including when the services are to begin, the frequency, duration, and location for the provision of services
Program modifications or supports provided to school personnel on behalf of the student
Least Restrictive Environment (LRE) data which includes calculations of the amount of time to be spent each day by the student in general-education settings compared to special-education settings
Explanation of any time the student will not participate along with non-disabled children
Accommodations to be provided during state and district assessments that are necessary to measuring the student's academic and functional performance

The student should attend when appropriate. If the student is over fourteen, they should be invited to become a part of the IEP team. Additionally, when the student is sixteen years of age, a statement of post-secondary goals and a plan for providing what the student needs to make a successful transition is required. This transition plan can be created at an earlier age if desired, but must be in place by the age of sixteen.

An IEP must also include other pertinent information found necessary by the team, such as a health plan or a behavior plan for some students.

Procedural requirements for development 
The outcome of the IEP development process is an official document that describes the education plan designed to meet the unique needs of a student with a disability.

Determination of eligibility for special education 

Before an IEP is written for a student with a disability, the school must first determine whether the student qualifies for special education services. To qualify, the child's disability must have an adverse effect on the child's educational progress.

To determine eligibility, the school must conduct a full evaluation of the child in all areas of suspected disability. Based in part on the results of the evaluation, the school along with the parents meet to review the resultsthe child's current level of performanceand to determine whether special education services are needed. In some cases, people may go undiagnosed because of strong visual memories and oral skills they possess, which can mask symptoms of having an impaired learning disorder.

If the child is found to be eligible for services, the school is required to convene an IEP team and develop an appropriate educational plan for the child. The IEP should be implemented as soon as possible after the child is determined eligible. IDEA does not state specific time frames for each step, but each state determines its own laws for identifying the criteria regarding education and how it should be followed. States have added specific timelines that schools must follow for the eligibility, IEP development, and IEP implementation milestones.

As outlined by IDEA, students can receive free appropriate education under special education law if they fall under one of 14 categories:

 Autism
 Deaf-blindness
 Deafness
 Developmental delay (for children aged 3–9, varies by state)
 Emotional and behavioral disorders
 Hearing impairment
 Intellectual disability (formerly referred to as 'mental retardation')
 Multiple disabilities
 Orthopedic impairment
 Other health impairment
 Specific learning disability
 Speech or language impairment
 Traumatic brain injury
 Visual impairment, including blindness

Although teachers and school psychologists have the ability to initiate evaluations for special education service eligibility, they are unqualified to make medical diagnoses. Attention deficit hyperactive disorder (ADHD), autism spectrum disorder (ASD), and physical and developmental delays must be diagnosed by a physician. Although most children with physical or developmental delays who have received consistent medical care  are diagnosed at an early stage by their pediatricians, it is imperative to include a medical professional in the student's evaluation process if one of the aforementioned conditions is suspected but undiagnosed.  When children are diagnosed early, they can start receiving services at earlier stages of development. State health and/or education departments offer early intervention services for children under the age of three years, while the public school system offers services for children from ages three through twenty-one.

Members of the IEP team 
The IEP team includes the student, the student's parent(s) or legal guardian(s), a special education teacher, at least one general-education teacher, a representative of the school or of the school district who is knowledgeable about the availability of school resources, and an individual who can interpret the instructional implications of the results of the student's evaluation (such as the school psychologist).

The parent or school may also bring other individuals who have knowledge or special expertise regarding the child. For example, the school may invite related service providers, such as speech and occupational therapists. The parent may invite professionals who have worked with or assessed the child or someone to assist the parent in advocating for the needs of their child, such as a parent advocate or an attorney.

If appropriate, the child may also participate in IEP team meetings. For example, some children begin participating in their IEP meetings when they reach middle school age.

A typical IEP team and team meeting includes:

 At least one of the child's parents or legal guardians. Parents are expected to be treated as equal participants with school personnel in developing the IEP as IDEA's policy states.
 A case manager or a representative of the school district (not the student's teacher) who is qualified to provide or supervise special education.
 The student's teacher(s) and principal(s). At least one teacher is required to attend, though all are invited.
 A general education teacher is required to attend if the recommended program includes activities with general education students, even if the child is in a special education class in the school.
 Any provider of a related service to the child. Normally, services include speech therapy, occupational therapy, or adapted physical education.
 Professionals who are qualified to explain the results of the testing. This usually requires at a psychologist and educational evaluator to attend if an assessment or report is reviewed. This usually occurs at the three-year review or triennial IEP.
The student's School Counselor may be needed in attendance to discuss courses that may be required for the student for his or her education.

The following people are invited, but not required to, attend:

 Other persons involved with the child who they feel are important for the IEP team to hear; for example, the child's psychologist or tutor. They are invited to attend by the parent(s).
 An educational advocate, a social worker, and/or a lawyer knowledgeable in the IEP process.
 Related service personnel (in person or written recommendation), if the student is receiving related services (such as speech therapy, music therapy, physical therapy or occupational therapy). It is valuable for related service personnel to attend the meeting or at least provide written recommendations concerning the services in their area of specialty.

Role of the parents 
Parents are to be considered full and equal members of the IEP team along with school personnel. Parents have the right to be involved in meetings that discuss the identification, evaluation, IEP development, and educational placement of their children. They also have the right to ask questions, dispute points, and request modifications to the plan, as do all members of the IEP team.

Although the IEP team are required to work toward a consensus, school personnel are ultimately responsible for ensuring that the IEP includes the services that the student needs. School districts are obligated by law to make a proposal for services to the parent. If an agreement cannot be reached, the school district cannot delay in providing the services which it believes are the best services to ensure that the student receives an effective educational program.

Most schools do not automatically provide parents a knowledgeable person to guide them through the IEP process. Parents usually have to do the research to know what their child's rights are and what the school can do to help their child. This is a policy failure that needs to be addressed. Advocates should be provided to students upon acceptance into the special education program. A new policy would solve the gap between those who can afford and those who cannot. IEP's are not automatically given to children whose parents believe they need special education resources. The child will be put through multiple different tests provided by the school to determine if the child will need special education resources. For these tests, parents are not allowed to decide which test will be conducted on their child but are required to give consent to have the school test the child. After parents decide and consent to have their child tested by the school, the district will have no more than 60 calendar days to complete the assessment on the child and put an IEP plan meeting in place. Based on these test results, an IEP plan would be put together in a meeting by both the school and the parents in order to be sure the child's needs will be met in school.

Under IDEA Part D, the United States Department of Education funds at least one parent training and information center in each state and most territories to provide parents the information they need to advocate effectively for their child. Some centers may also provide a knowledgeable person to accompany a parent to IEP meetings to assist the parent in the process.

The school is mandated to make an effort to ensure that at least one parent is present at each IEP team meeting. If they do not attend, the school is required to show that due diligence was made to enable them to attend, including notifying the parents early enough that they have an opportunity to attend, scheduling the meeting at a mutually agreed on time and place, offering alternative means of participation, such as a phone conference.

The school is required to ensure that the parent understands the proceedings of IEP team meetings and to include an interpreter for parents who are deaf or whose native language is not English.

Developing the student's individualized educational plan  
After the student is determined to be eligible for special education services, the IEP team is required to develop an IEP to be implemented as soon as possible after eligibility is determined. Using the results of the full individual evaluation (FIE), the IEP team works together to identify the student's present level of educational performance, as well as the student's specific academic and any related or special services that the child needs in order to benefit from their education.

When developing an IEP, the team must consider the strengths of the student, the concerns of the parent for their student's education, results of the initial or most recent evaluation of the child (including private evaluations conducted by the parents), and the academic, developmental, and functional needs of the student. The team must also consider areas of deficit. Corresponding annual goals and objectives should be created to improve these areas. In the case of a student whose behavior impedes their own learning or that of other children, the team is required to consider positive behavior intervention and support to address the behavior. A Functional Behavior Assessment (FBA) may be required by the team to address the behavioral concerns. An FBA is conducted by a child psychologist with input from the IEP team.

The IEP team is required to consider the student's communication needs. For example, if a student is blind or visually impaired, the IEP is mandated to provide instruction in braille unless an evaluation of the student's reading and writing skills, needs, and future needs indicate that this instruction is not appropriate for the student. If a student is deaf or hard of hearing, the team is required to consider the child's language and communication needs, including the need to communicate with school personnel and peers, and the student's need for direct instruction in the child's language and communication mode. In the case of a child with limited English proficiency, the team is required to consider the language needs of the child as those needs relate to the child's IEP.

A matrix is drafted containing the student's present level of performance, indicators about ways the student's disability influences participation and progress in the general curriculum, a statement of measurable goals that include benchmarks or short-term objectives, the specific educational services to be provided which include program modifications or supports, an explanation of the extent that the child will not participate in general education, a description of all modifications in statewide or district-wide assessments, the projected date for services to begin and their expected duration, the annual statement of transition service needs (beginning at age 14), a statement of inter-agency responsibilities to ensure continuity of services when the student leaves school (by age 16), and a statement regarding how the student's progress will be measured and how the parents will be informed in the process.

IDEA requires a student's IEP to be developed solely based on their needs and not on pre-existing programs or services available in the district. Whether particular services are available in the district should not be considered when identifying the services a student needs to receive an appropriate education.

Determining the appropriate placement 

After the IEP is developed, the IEP team determines placement—the environment in which the student's IEP can most readily be implemented. IDEA requires that the IEP is completed before placement decisions are made so that the student's educational needs drive the IEP development process. Schools may not develop a child's IEP to fit into a pre-existing program for a particular classification of disability; the placement is chosen to fit the IEP, which is written to fit the student.

IDEA requires state and local education agencies to educate children with disabilities with their non-disabled peers to the maximum extent appropriate. A child can only be placed in a separate school or special classes if the severity or nature of the disability prevents the student from receiving an appropriate education in the regular classroom, even with the use of supplementary aids and services. When determining placement, the starting assumption must be the student's current academic level and needs as evident by the disability.

Some of the more common placement settings include the general education classroom, an integrated class, a resource class, a self-contained class, and other settings, which include separate schools and residential facilities.  A school system may meet its obligation to ensure that the child has an appropriate placement available by providing an appropriate program for the child on its own, consulting with another agency to provide an appropriate program, or utilizing some other mechanism/arrangement that is consistent with IDEA. The placement group bases its decision on the IEP and which placement option is appropriate for the child.  The general education classroom is seen as the least restrictive environment. In addition to the general education teacher, there will also ideally be a special education teacher. The special education teacher adjusts the curriculum to the student's needs. Most school-age IEP students spend at least 80 percent of their school time in this setting with their peers. Research suggests students with special needs benefit from being included in general education and its curriculum.

An integrated classroom is made up of mostly neurotypical children and several children who have IEPs. These are typically higher functioning children with disabilities that require help in areas of social skills. This setting allows them to model the behavior of neurotypical children. Typically, there is an aide in this classroom setting to assist those children with IEPs.

The resource class is where the special education teacher works with small groups of students using techniques that work more efficiently with the students. This setting is available for students who spend between 40 and 79 percent of their time in the general education classroom. The term "resource" in this context refers to the amount of time spent outside general education, not the form of instruction.

Another setting option is the separate classroom. When students spend less than 40 percent of their day in the general education class, they are said to be placed in a separate class. They are allowed to work in small, highly structured settings with a special education teacher. Students in a separate class may be working at different academic levels. Other settings include separate schools and residential facilities. Students in these settings receive highly specialized training to address both special learning and behavioral needs and acquire both academic and life skills instruction. These schools have the highest degree of structure, routine, and consistency.

Implementation and review 

After the IEP is developed and placement is determined, the student's teachers are responsible for implementing all educational services, program modifications, or supports as indicated by the individual education plan. Schools are required to have an IEP in effect at the beginning of the school year. Initial IEPs are required to be developed within 30 days after eligibility is determined, and the services specified in the child's IEP are required to be provided as soon as possible after the IEP is developed.

An initial IEP is required to be accepted and signed by a parent or guardian before any of the outlined services may begin. Formerly, parents had 30 calendar days to take the paperwork home for their consideration. Currently, the IEP must be signed or appealed within 10 days, or the school can implement the most recent version.

The IEP team is responsible for conducting an annual review to ensure that the student is meeting goals and/or making progress on the benchmarks specified for each objective. If an IEP is not helping the student in the classroom, an immediate revision is to occur.

The school's special education program is funded by the federal government. The funding is based on the overall student attendance. This means that the school's reaction is to automatically deny a child who is believed to need the special education program due to funding. The federal government needs to give more money to the school districts and the school districts need to allocate more money to the special education program. By doing this, more students would receive the services they need. Once a student has been tested and confirmed of such disability, an IEP plan would be put in place. The child will stay in special education unless their parents or legal guardians request removal or if the child met all their IEP goals and re-tests out. Some special education programs will slowly test the child out in general education classes. This is done in order to make sure the child will succeed without need of the special education program. If the child can be successful in a general classroom, then there is no more need for the child to be in special education. If the child is unable to be successful in the general education classes, the IEP participants will come back together to see why the child was not succeeding. The goal of the school is to have the child succeed in school no matter the resources needed to get them there.

Procedural safeguards 
School personnel have an obligation to provide parents with a Procedural Safeguards Notice, which is required to include an explanation of all of the procedural safeguards built into IDEA. The information must be understandable and in the native language of the parent.

A copy of the Procedural Safeguards Notice is required to be present at an IEP meeting. The school must give the parent a copy of the child's IEP at no cost.

An extensive system of conflict resolution procedures are set out in the statutory provisions. They include the right to examine records, advance notification of intent to change the educational program, the right to engage in mediation, and a right to an impartial due process hearing.

Services that may be provided to a child with a disability 
Specially designed instruction
Parental involvement
Related services
Program modifications
Classroom accommodations
Supplementary aids and services
Resource room

Specially designed instruction 
Specially designed instruction affects the instructional content, method of instructional delivery, and the performance methods and criteria that are necessary to help the student make meaningful educational progress. This instruction is designed by or with an appropriately credentialed special education teacher or related service provider. Students may have better success with small-group instruction as presented in a resource room (mandated by program and placement outlined in the IEP) particularly with language-based instruction.

For some students, teachers may need to present information through the use of manipulatives. For other students, teachers may need to select and teach only important key concepts and then alter evaluation activities and criteria to match this content change.

The IEP team determines whether a specific type of instruction is included in a student's IEP. Generally, if the methodology is an essential part of what is required to meet the individualized needs of the student, the methodology is included. For instance, if a student has a learning disability and has not learned to read using traditional methods, then another method is used. When including such an IEP recommendation, the team describes the components of the appropriate type of methodology, as opposed to naming a specific program.

Parental involvement 
Research has shown the importance of parental involvement in a child's education. James Griffith (1996) found that schools having higher levels of parental involvement and empowerment also had higher student criterion-referenced test scores. Although much attention has been focused on ways of involving the parent in school activities, little has been written on how to better involve parents of special education students. The U.S. Office of Education 1998 revisions to IDEA contained major changes designed to increase the parent's involvement in the educational process. These revisions required school districts to invite the parent to be involved in the diagnosis of the disability, determination of the need for special education programs and services and the extent to which the child would receive these services.

Program modifications 
Modifications can be made to the program's content, such as lowering criteria for academic success, decreasing alternative state assessments, such as off-grade level assessments, or allowing the student to receive a "focused grade"a grade that is recognized in a high school diploma, but is noted as "focused".

Classroom accommodations 
Some of a student's educational needs may be met using class accommodations. Accommodations are typically provided by general educators within the general education environment. Accommodations do not involve modifying the material's content but rather allows students to receive information or to demonstrate what they have learned in ways that work around their impairment, thereby minimizing the likelihood of a significant disability. For example, a child may complete fewer/different parts of a homework assignment or an assessment than other students. They may also write shorter papers or be given different projects and assignments in replacement of the original task.

Accommodations may also include provisions such as preferential seating, providing photocopies of teacher notes, giving oral rather than written quizzes, extended time for tests and assignments, use of a word processor or laptop, taking tests in a quiet room, prompts and reminders for focus breaks for sensory needs, and assistance with specific subject areas.

Modifications in the curriculum can occur if a student needs to learn material that the class has moved on from, like working on exponents while the class is moving on to applying them in the order of operations. They also may occur in grading rubrics, where a student with an IEP may be assessed on different standards than other students.

Supplementary aids and services 
Assistive technology
Teacher's aide in classroom that provides additional support for one or more specific students

Related services 
If the child needs additional services to access or benefit from special education, schools are required to provide the related services, which include: speech therapy, occupational or physical therapy, interpreters, medical services (for example, a nurse to perform procedures the child needs during the day, for example, catheterization), orientation and mobility services, parent counseling, and training to help parents support the implementation of their child's IEP, psychological or counseling services, recreation services, rehabilitation, social work services, and transportation. If necessary a student is provided with specialized transportation. This can be the case if the student has a severe disability and requires a wheelchair, or is identified to have an emotional problem.

Other countries 
In the United Kingdom, the equivalent document is called an Individual Education System.

Canada 
Canada has similar documents called an Individualized Education Plan, a Special Education Plan (SEP), Individualized Program Plan (IPP), Student Support Plan (SSP), or an Individual Support Services Plan (ISSP), depending on the province or territory. The IEP system in Canada functions relatively similar to the US, though regulations vary between provinces.

Saudi Arabia 
In Saudi Arabia, the document is known as an Individual Education Program. In Saudi Arabia, all schools must provide an IEP for all students who have disabilities. The process of creating an IEP in Saudi Arabia may exclude the parents and other providers of services.

See also 
 Individualized instruction
 Special Assistance Program (Australian education)
 Section 504 of the Rehabilitation Act

Notes

References 

Katsiyannis, A., & Maag, J. W. (2001). Educational methodologies: Legal and practical considerations. Preventing School Failure, 46(1), 31–36.
Lewis, A. C. (2005). The old, new IDEA. The Education Digest, 70(5), 68–70.
Patterson, K. (2005). What classroom teachers need to know about IDEA '97. Kappa Delta Pi Record, 41(2), 62–67.
Weishaar, M. K. (2001). The regular educator's role in the individual education plan process. The Clearing House, 75(2), 96–98.
Ormrod, Jeanne Ellis. Educational Psychology: Developing Learners (fifth edition). Pearson, Merrill Prentice Hall, 2006.

Pierangelo, Roger, & Giuliani, George. (2004). Transition services in special education: A practical approach. Pearson Education, Inc., . 3–9. Print.

External links 
 Model of a UK IEP Learning Trust, Hackney, UK
 All About the IEP from the National Dissemination Center for Children with Disabilities
 Individual Education Programme in New Zealand
 

I
High School Diploma